Acer Inc AT Series includes a wide range of LED and LCD Tvs: 

Series AT58 LED designed by Pininfarina
Series AT85: 42” and  32”
Series AT26 LED: comes in four widescreen display sizes: 19”, 20”, 23”, and 32”
LCD TVs in 26” and 32” format.

Acer AT58 TV Led designed by Pininfarina

September 2010, at IFA Berlin, Acer Inc. presented a TV Led series designed by the Italian car designer Pininfarina. It comes in five widescreen display sizes: 20”, 23”(available in black-and-white version), 27”, 32” and 42”. 
Beside the 20” model with 1600x900 HD resolution, all others are Full HD 1080p.
All series is equipped with InfiniContrast technology.

References

External links
 Official Acer products page
 IFA-Global Innovations Consumer Electronics Show

Acer Inc. products